The Judiciary Act of 1925 (43 Stat. 936), also known as the Judge's Bill or Certiorari Act, was an act of the United States Congress that sought to reduce the workload of the Supreme Court of the United States.

Background
Although the Judiciary Act of 1891 (which created the United States courts of appeals and rendered a small part of the Supreme Court's jurisdiction discretionary subject to grant of writ of certiorari) had relieved pressure on the Supreme Court's docket, the court remained obliged to rule:

on the merits all cases appealed to it over which it had jurisdiction … [after the 1891 act, ] Congress gave the Court discretionary review authority over appellate decisions in diversity, patent, revenue, criminal and admiralty cases. Parties wishing to appeal such cases would file a petition for certiorari, which the Court could grant or deny without passing on the merits.

Nonetheless, the number of appeals was a one-way upward ratchet, and the Justices argued that the only way to fix the problem once and for all was to have the Court conduct virtually all of its business by way of writ of certiorari.

Proposal

In December 1921, Chief Justice William Howard Taft appointed three justices to draw up a proposal that would amend the Judicial Code of the United States, and define further the jurisdiction of the nation's circuit courts.  The resulting bill, created by Justices Willis Van Devanter, James Clark McReynolds, and George Sutherland, took many trips to Congress (which were not lengthy because until 1935 the Supreme Court had its chambers in the U.S. Capitol) by the Chief Justice and his associates. Taft also journeyed to the United Kingdom in 1922, to study the procedural structure of British courts.

When approved in 1925, "the Judges Bill", as it was known, dramatically shrank the number of cases coming directly to the court, yet retained a mandatory oversight on cases that raised questions involving federal jurisdiction. It called for the circuit courts of appeals to have appellate jurisdiction to review 'by appeal or writ of error' final decisions in the district courts, as well as for the district courts of Alaska, Hawaii, Puerto Rico, China, the United States Virgin Islands, and the Panama Canal Zone.  The circuit courts were also empowered to modify, enforce or set aside orders of the Interstate Commerce Commission, the Federal Reserve Board, and the Federal Trade Commission. The bill further provided that "A final judgment or decree in any suit in the highest court of a State in which a decision in the suit could be had, where is drawn in question the validity of a treaty or statute of the United States may be reviewed by the Supreme Court on a writ of error."  Lastly, cases involving final decrees which brought into question the validity of a wide range of Federal or state treaties would come to the Court by certiorari. Four justices would be required to vote affirmatively to accept petitions, which meant that the Court's agenda would now be controlled by "judicial review" and that thousands of cases clogging the dockets could now be cut to hundreds that met the new requirements.

The Chief Justice vigorously pursued the passage of this bill, taking his fellow justices with him to Congress over the four years in which the bill was discussed.  Congress chose to pass the act in 1925. This action rendered the majority of the Supreme Court's workload discretionary by removing the possibility of direct appeal to the court in most circumstances. Henceforth, pursuant to §237(b) of the act, appellants would file petitions for writs of certiorari with the Supreme Court, which would be accepted at the discretion of four of the nine Justices. "No longer did the Court have to hear almost every case an unhappy litigant presented to it. Instead, for the most part, the Court could select only those relatively few cases involving issues important enough to require a decision from the Supreme Court."

See also
 Supreme Court Case Selections Act

References

Further reading
 Sternberg, Jonathan. "Deciding Not to Decide: The Judiciary Act of 1925 and the Discretionary Court". The Journal of Supreme Court History, Vol. 33, pp. 1–16 (March 2008). . .

External links
Text of the bill
The Supreme Court Historical Society: Merlo Pusey, The Judge's Bill After Half a Century

1925 in American law
1925 in the United States
1925
History of the Supreme Court of the United States
68th United States Congress